Andrew Zimmerman McCarty (July 14, 1808 – April 23, 1879) was an American politician.  He served as a U.S. Representative from New York.

Early life and education
Born in Rhinebeck, New York, McCarty studied law.

Career
He was admitted to the bar in 1831 and commenced practice in Pulaski, New York. He served as county clerk of Oswego County from 1840 to 1843. He was a member of the New York State Assembly (Oswego Co., 2nd D.) during the 71st New York State Legislature in 1848.

McCarty was elected as an Opposition Party candidate to the Thirty-fourth Congress (March 4, 1855 – March 3, 1857).

He resumed the practice of his profession in Pulaski, where he served as Register of bankruptcy (1875–1879).

Death
He died in Pulaski on April 23, 1879.  He was interred in Pulaski Cemetery.

Sources

1808 births
1879 deaths
19th-century American politicians
Members of the New York State Assembly
Opposition Party members of the United States House of Representatives from New York (state)
People from Pulaski, New York
People from Rhinebeck, New York